Chelyan is a census-designated place (CDP) in Kanawha County, West Virginia, United States. Chelyan is located on the south bank of the Kanawha River, southeast of Chesapeake. It is served by Exit 85 of the West Virginia Turnpike. As of the 2010 census, its population was 776.

The community has the name of Chelyan Calvert, the child of an early postmaster.

Notable person

Former NBA player, coach, and general manager Jerry West was born in Chelyan.

References

Census-designated places in Kanawha County, West Virginia
Census-designated places in West Virginia
Populated places on the Kanawha River